MRS Oil Nigeria Plc is a Nigerian oil marketing company with headquarters in Lagos. The firm previously traded under the name of Texaco Nigeria Plc.

MRS Oil has three business units: sale of petroleum at retail outlets or to industries, sale of aviation fuel and blending of lubricants.

Previously known as Texaco Nigeria Plc, a firm whose activities in Nigeria dates back to 1969 when it was established to take over the Nigerian trading interest of Texaco Africa Limited. In 2009, a consortium of MRS Holdings and Petroci Holdings bought majority stake from Chevron Oil and Gas to form MRS Oil Nigeria PLC.

References

Oil and gas companies of Nigeria
Energy companies established in 1969
Companies listed on the Nigerian Stock Exchange